"Reminiscing" is a 1978 song by Australian rock music group Little River Band.

Reminiscing may also refer to:

 Reminiscing (Buddy Holly album), 1963, and the title song
 Reminiscing (Chet Atkins and Hank Snow album), 1964
 Reminiscing (Slim Whitman album), 1967
 Reminiscing, a 1965 album by Johnny Smith
 "Reminiscin", a 2001 song by Ella Mae Saison, featuring CeCe Peniston

See also
 Just Reminiscin', 2000 compilation album of songs recorded by American singer Jo Stafford
 Reminisce (disambiguation)